Marcellus was the 6th Roman Prefect of the province of Judea.

Biography
He was a friend of Lucius Vitellius, who appointed him after sending Pontius Pilate to Rome (in 36 or 37) to render account. It may be assumed, however, that Marcellus was not really a governor of Judea, but only a subordinate official of Vitellius. Indeed, this is the only instance where Josephus, in designating the office of Marcellus, uses the Greek expression epimeletes (ἐπιμελητής), "overseer", which is uncommon, and we are not certain whether Marcellus really had the powers of a prefect or was merely a caretaker. No official act of Marcellus is reported. In 37, he was replaced by Marullus.

However, some insight into the changed situation in Jerusalem after the departure of Pilate is seen in the contrast between the trial and execution of Jesus and that of the first Christian martyr Saint Stephen. In the former, the Sanhedrin (Jewish Council) passed the death sentence but dared not carry it out without the prefect's endorsement, and the execution was carried out by the Roman state. In the case of Stephen, the Romans were ignored and the hurried execution was by the old Jewish method of stoning. It would appear that a temporary overseer may have preferred to stay in Caesarea and turn a blind eye to the growing confidence and aggression of the Jewish leaders.

References

External links
 Livius.org: Marcellus

Roman governors of Judaea
1st-century Romans
1st-century Roman governors of Judaea
1st-century deaths
Year of birth unknown